Denise René (born Denise Bleibtreu; June 1913 – 9 July 2012) was a French art gallerist specializing in kinetic art and op art.

Life and work
Denise René took as her guiding principle the idea that art must invent new paths in order to exist. The first exhibitions organised by René were in June 1945. She studied geometric abstraction and kinetic art. Her work has been championed by art historian Frank Popper.

René showed modern art masters such as Max Ernst and Francis Picabia during her first five years of activity. Denise René developed different generations of abstract art by introducing to Paris the historical figures of the concrete avant-gardes of Eastern Europe while seeking historical antecedents like Marcel Duchamp. In 1955 she organized the exhibition Le Mouvement, which helped to popularize kinetic art. Following that show she exhibited works by Nicolas Schöffer, Yacov Agam, Jean Tinguely, Otto Piene, Jean Arp, Alexander Calder, Carlos Cruz-Diez, Jesús Rafael Soto, Henryk Stażewski, Victor Vasarely, Marino Di Teana, Sophie Taeuber-Arp, Gregorio Vardanega, Pol Bury, Wen-Ying Tsai, Le Corbusier, Robert Delaunay, Nadir Afonso, Max Bill and Sonia Delaunay, among others.

In 1957, she presented the first solo exhibition of Piet Mondrian in Paris. Aside from Paris, she had galleries in New York City (1971-1981) and Düsseldorf (1969) with Hans Mayer. In 2001, the Centre Georges Pompidou paid homage to her with an exhibition titled "Denise René, une galerie dans l'aventure de l'art abstrait. 1944-1978".

See also
 Conceptual art
 Postmodern art
 Computer art
 Electronic art
 Systems art
 New Media Art
 Generative art

References

External links
 Official web site of Denise René's gallery (in French)
 Article from La Paddythèque (in French)

French art dealers
Women art dealers
1913 births
2012 deaths
Businesspeople from Paris
Date of birth missing